Steven "Stef" Bos (born 12 July 1961 in Veenendaal) is a Dutch singer who has been living in Cape Town, South Africa. He sings in Dutch (and occasionally in Afrikaans), and has been successful in Belgium, the Netherlands and South Africa ever since his breakthrough single "Papa" (Daddy) came out in 1990.

He wrote Belgium's entry into the 1989 Eurovision Song Contest, "Door De Wind".

Stef recorded an album (Together as One) in 1993 on which he worked together with Johannes Kerkorrel and Tandie Klaasen, two famous South African singers. From that moment on he fell in love with South Africa, the language Afrikaans and its music. We can hear the influence from Africa in his later albums like De onderstroom (The Undercurrent).

Discography

Albums
1990 - Is dit nu later
1992 - Tussen de liefde en de leegte
1994 - Vuur
1995 - Schaduw in de nacht
1997 - De onderstroom
1998 - Stad en land - Live 92/98
1999 - Zien
2000 - Beste van Bos (South Africa)
2000 - Noord & Zuid (Het beste van Stef Bos)
2001 - Van Mpumalanga tot die Kaap
2003 - Donker en licht
2003 - Donker en licht (Limited edition, South Africa, 5000 copies)
2003 - Jy vir my
2003 - Donker en licht (Limited edition, 3000 copies)
2005 - Ruimtevaarder (South Africa)
2005 - Ruimtevaarder
2007 - Storm
2009 - In een ander licht
2010 - Kloofstraat
2011 - Minder Meer
2013 - Mooie waanzinnige wereld
2015 - Kaalvoet
2015 - Sprong in de tijd
2017 - Kern
2019 - In Een Ander Licht 2019
2019 - Ridder van Toledo
2020 - Tijd om te gaan leven

Singles
1990 - Is dit nu later
1990 - Gek Zijn Is Gezond
1991 - Laat Vandaag Een Dag Zijn
1991 - Papa
1991 - Breek De Stilte
1991 - Wat een wonder
1992 - Jij Bent Voor Mij
1993 - De Radio
1993 - Awuwa (Zij Wil Dansen)
1994 - Vuur/Pepermunt
1994 - Pepermunt/Vuur
1994 - Hilton Barcelona
1995 - Twee Mannen Zo Stil
1995 - Vrouwen Aan De Macht
1996 - Schaduw In De Nacht
1996 - Two Of A Kind
1996 - Onder In My Whiskeyglas
1997 - De Dag Zal Komen
1997 - De Tovenaar
1999 - Papa (live)
1999 - Ik Geloof In Jou
1999 - Niets Te Verliezen
2000 - Ginette
2000 - Kind Van de Vijand
2000 - Suikerbossie
2003 - Ik Mis Jou
2003 - Engjelushe
2004 - Zij Weet
2005 - Ruimtevaarder
2009 - In een ander licht
2010 - Kloofstraat

References

External links
Stef Bos Official Site
Stef Bos Lyrics in German and French
Guitar tabs from Stef Bos

1961 births
Living people
Dutch emigrants to South Africa
Dutch male singers
People from Veenendaal